A nurse tree is a larger, faster-growing tree that shelters a smaller, slower-growing tree or plant. The nurse tree can provide shade, shelter from wind, or protection from animals who would feed on the smaller plant.

For example, the Norway Spruce (Picea abies) and Larch (Larix) can function as a nurses for hardwoods. In the Sonoran Desert, Palo Verde, ironwood and mesquite trees serve as nurse trees for young saguaro cacti. As the Saguaro grows and becomes more acclimated to the desert sun, the older tree may die, leaving the saguaro alone. As the Saguaro grows larger, it may compete with its nurse tree for resources, hastening its death. Consequently, young saguaros are often seen adjacent to trees, while old saguaros are not.

References

John Vandermeer.  Saguaros and Nurse Trees: A New Hypothesis to Account for Population Fluctuations.  The Southwestern Naturalist, Vol. 25, No. 3 (Nov. 14, 1980), pp. 357–360. 

Trees
Forest ecology